Rice Township is one of twenty-three townships in Jo Daviess County, Illinois, USA.  As of the 2010 census, its population was 338 and it contained 268 housing units.  It was formed as Washington Township from East Galena Township on February 22, 1859; its name changed to Rice Township on June 16, 1859.

Geography

Cemeteries
The township contains Prospect Hill Methodist Episcopalian Cemetery.

Airports and landing strips
 Merkle Engineers Airport.

Landmarks and recreation
 Chestnut Mountain Ski Resort.
 Spratts Lake.

Demographics

School districts
 Galena Unit School District 120.
 River Ridge Community Unit School District 210.

Political districts
 Illinois' 16th congressional district.
 State House District 89.
 State Senate District 45.

References
 
 United States Census Bureau 2007 TIGER/Line Shapefiles.
 United States National Atlas.

External links
 Jo Daviess County official site.
 City-Data.com.
 Illinois State Archives.
 Township Officials of Illinois.

Townships in Jo Daviess County, Illinois
Townships in Illinois